Adrian Gal (born 6 September 1970) is a Romanian gymnast. He competed in eight events at the 1992 Summer Olympics.

References

1970 births
Living people
Romanian male artistic gymnasts
Olympic gymnasts of Romania
Gymnasts at the 1992 Summer Olympics
Place of birth missing (living people)